WPIW (1590 AM) is a radio station broadcasting a classic country format. Licensed to Mount Vernon, Indiana, United States, the station serves the Posey County area. The station is currently owned by The Original Company, Inc.

WPIW runs several sporting events, including North Posey High School football and basketball. WPIW began broadcasting in 1955 as WPCO.

On December 19, 2016, WRCY changed its format from country to sports, with programming from Fox Sports Radio.

On July 25, 2022, WRCY changed its format from sports to classic country, branded as "AM 1590 & FM 98.9 WPIW". The station changed its call letters to WPIW on September 12, 2022.

Previous logos

References

External links
Indiana Broadcasters Association - WRCY-FM

PIW
Classic country radio stations in the United States
Radio stations established in 1955
1955 establishments in Indiana